In mathematics, the Moore plane, also sometimes called Niemytzki plane (or Nemytskii plane, Nemytskii's tangent disk topology), is a topological space.  It is a completely regular Hausdorff space (also called Tychonoff space) that is not normal.  It is named after Robert Lee Moore and Viktor Vladimirovich Nemytskii.

Definition

Elements of the local basis at points  are sets  where A is an open disc in the upper half-plane which is tangent to the x axis at p.

That is, the local basis is given by

Properties
The Moore plane  is separable, that is, it has a countable dense subset.
The Moore plane is a completely regular Hausdorff space (i.e. Tychonoff space), which is not normal.
The subspace  of  has, as its subspace topology, the discrete topology. Thus, the Moore plane shows that a subspace of a separable space need not be separable.
The Moore plane is first countable, but not second countable or Lindelöf.
The Moore plane is not locally compact.
The Moore plane is countably metacompact but not metacompact.

Proof that the Moore plane is not normal
The fact that this space  is not normal can be established by the following counting argument (which is very similar to the argument that the Sorgenfrey plane is not normal):
 Hence  is not normal, because by the Tietze extension theorem all continuous functions defined on a closed subspace of a normal space can be extended to a continuous function on the whole space.

In fact, if X is a separable topological space having an uncountable closed discrete subspace, X cannot be normal.

See also
Moore space (disambiguation)
Hedgehog space

References
 Stephen Willard. General Topology, (1970) Addison-Wesley .
  (Example 82)
 

Topological spaces